Zheng Lin (1908–1987) was a Chinese calligrapher and People's Republic of China politician. He was born in Yongji, Shanxi. He was vice-governor and CPPCC Committee Chairman of Shanxi. He was a delegate to the 3rd National People's Congress and a member of the Standing Committee of the Chinese People's Political Consultative Conference.

1908 births
1987 deaths
Chinese Communist Party politicians from Shanxi
People's Republic of China politicians from Shanxi
CPPCC Committee Chairmen of Shanxi
Vice-governors of Shanxi
People from Yongji, Shanxi
People's Republic of China calligraphers
Delegates to the 3rd National People's Congress
Members of the Standing Committee of the 5th Chinese People's Political Consultative Conference
Artists from Shanxi
Politicians from Yuncheng